Hammerdal is a locality in Strömsund Municipality, Jämtland County, Sweden. It had 974 inhabitants in 2010. It is historically associated with Hammond, Louisiana, USA, by way of a Swedish immigrant who founded the Louisiana city.

References 

Populated places in Strömsund Municipality
Jämtland